Neritona juttingae, also known as the King Koopa Nerite Snail, is a species of a freshwater snail, an aquatic gastropod mollusk in the family Neritidae.

Description

Distribution
The holotype was found in the River Musi near Palembang, Sumatra, Indonesia.

Human use
It is a part of ornamental pet trade for freshwater aquaria.

References

 Eichhorst T.E. (2016). Neritidae of the world. Volume 2. Harxheim: Conchbooks. Pp. 696-1366

External links
 Mienis H. (1973). Notes on recent and fossil Neritidae. 3. Neritina juttingae, new name for Nerita aculeata Gmelin, 1791, non Müller, 1774 (Mollusca, Gastropoda). Basteria. 37: 39-40
  Gmelin J.F. (1791). Vermes. In: Gmelin J.F. (Ed.) Caroli a Linnaei Systema Naturae per Regna Tria Naturae, Ed. 13. Tome 1(6). G.E. Beer, Lipsiae [Leipzig. pp. 3021-3910]

Neritidae
Gastropods described in 1973